Sony Pictures Family Entertainment Group (also known as Sony Family Entertainment Group) was an American and global company that was established in February 1999 by Sony Pictures Entertainment that handles all of the family programs and films by Sony Pictures. It was formalized on September 1, 1999. On January 17, 2001, Sony Pictures Family Entertainment Group acquired 3.8% in BKN International.

On June 20, 2007, Sony Wonder, the former kids label division of Sony BMG Music Entertainment, was moved to Sony Pictures Home Entertainment as the kids and family entertainment label. Steve Okin, the vice president of Sony Wonder, was named vice president of family entertainment.

Sony Pictures Family Entertainment Group also distributes classic children’s programming from the libraries of Sony Pictures Television, such as Wheel 2000, JEP!, Joker! Joker! Joker!, and The Junior Pyramid.

List of programs

The following series are listed for this group:

Jeannie (1973–1975)
Partridge Family 2200 A.D. (1974)
The Real Ghostbusters (1986–1991)
Dinosaucers (1987)
Slimer! and the Real Ghostbusters (1988–1990)
The Karate Kid: The Animated Series (1989)
Beakman's World (1992–1998)
The Adventures of Hyperman (1995-1996)
Big Guy and Rusty the Boy Robot (1996–1999)
Project G.e.e.K.e.R. (1996–1997)
Jumanji: The Series (1996–1999)
Channel Umptee-3 (1997)
Extreme Ghostbusters (1997)
Men in Black: The Series (1997–2001)
Godzilla: The Series (1998–2000)
Dragon Tales (1999–2001; 2005)
Roughnecks: The Starship Troopers Chronicles (1999–2001)
Jackie Chan Adventures (2000–2005)
Max Steel (2000–2002)
Alienators: Evolution Continues (2001–2002)
Harold and the Purple Crayon (2001–2002)
Phantom Investigators (2001–2002)
Astro Boy (2003)
Stuart Little: The Animated Series (2003)
The Spectacular Spider-Man (2008–2009)

References

External links
  Official Sony Wonder website

Sony Pictures Entertainment
Sony Pictures Television
Entertainment companies based in California
Entertainment companies established in 1999
1999 establishments in California